Aurora is a city in north-central Sevier County, Utah, United States. The population was 1,016 at the 2010 census.

Aurora is predominantly supported by agriculture, coal mining, and the service sector. Most residents commute to one of the neighboring communities to work. Children are schooled in Salina at one of the three public schools. The current growth in the community is attributed to the growth of business and industry in the region.

Geography

Climate
This climatic region is typified by large seasonal temperature differences, with warm to hot (and often humid) summers and cold (sometimes severely cold) winters. According to the Köppen Climate Classification system, Aurora has a humid continental climate, abbreviated "Dfb" on climate maps.

History
Aurora was founded in 1875 by Ezra White (or Ezra Curtis, according to some accounts) and three other families along the banks of the Sevier River. Aurora's settling came under the direction of Brigham Young. He called on families to settle in South Central Utah. Originally named Willow Bend, the name was changed to Aurora due to the presence of the Northern Lights. The city was moved west two to three miles along the Rocky Ford Canal to avoid the spring flooding accompanying life along the Sevier. This location also enabled significant cultivation of the foothills. Those families that settled in the region often left the comfortable surroundings of Northern Utah to settle in what one original resident described as a desolate region without a green tree in sight. Over time, however, settlers planted crops, and trees and utilized irrigation to create a very beautiful and livable community.

Nestled in the fertile Sevier Valley, Aurora slowly grew as more settlers moved west. While growth occurred more rapidly in the accompanying communities of Salina and Richfield, Aurora grew largely due to the settling of children of many of the large families in the city. Most current residents can track their lineage to one of the four founding families of the city.

Demographics

As of the census of 2000, there were 947 people, 303 households, and 269 families residing in the city. The population density was 936.1 people per square mile (362.0/km2). There were 321 housing units at an average density of 317.3 per square mile (122.7/km2). The racial makeup of the city was 97.68% White, 0.53% Native American, 0.63% Asian, 0.21% Pacific Islander, 0.84% from other races, and 0.11% from two or more races. Hispanic or Latino of any race were 1.37% of the population.

There were 303 households, of which 43.6% had children under 18 living with them, 83.8% were married couples living together, 4.3% had a female householder with no husband present, and 11.2% were non-families. 10.9% of all households were made up of individuals, and 6.6% had someone living alone who was 65 years of age or older. The average household size was 3.13, and the average family size was 3.38.

In the city, the population was spread out, with 33.2% under 18, 9.3% from 18 to 24, 25.0% from 25 to 44, 20.3% from 45 to 64, and 12.2% aged 65 years of age or older. The median age was 32 years. For every 100 females, there were 93.7 males. For every 100 females aged 18 and over, there were 100.3 males.

The median income for a household in the city was $44,911, and the median income for a family was $50,000. Males had a median income of $38,750 versus $20,156 for females. The per capita income for the city was $15,920. About 3.5% of families and 4.2% of the population were below the poverty line, including 3.5% of those under age 18 and 10.5% of those aged 65 or over.

Notable person

 David E. Sorensen, an LDS Church leader

See also

 List of cities and towns in Utah

References

External links

 

Cities in Utah
Cities in Sevier County, Utah
Populated places established in 1875
1875 establishments in Utah Territory